Dangerous Kiss is a 1999 novel by Jackie Collins and the fifth novel in her Santangelo novels series.

1999 British novels
British romance novels
Santangelo novels